A "predictable surprise" describes a situation or circumstance in which avoidable crises are marginalized in order to satisfy economic and social policies.

Definition
Max H. Bazerman and Michael D. Watkins define "predictable surprises" as problems that 
 at least some people are aware of, 
 are getting worse over time, and 
 are likely to explode into a crisis eventually,
 but are not prioritized by key decision-makers or have not elicited a response fast enough to prevent severe damage. 

The problems behind "predictable surprises" tend to require a significant investment in the near term that will not pay off until later. This could involve changes to established organization culture and/or changes that competing interests do not benefit from.

Examples of predictable surprises
 Iraq War
 Enron scandal
 Subprime mortgage crisis
 Hurricane Katrina government response
 Global warming
 Roman Catholic sex abuse cases

Citations

References
 M. Bazerman and M. Watkins (2004) Predictable Surprises: The Disasters You Should Have Seen Coming, and How to Prevent Them. 
 B. Tuchman (1984) The March of Folly: From Troy to Vietnam. 

Strategic management